Birgit Lorenz (born 20 August 1963 in East Berlin, East Germany) is a former East German pair skater who competed with Knut Schubert.  They won the gold medal at the East German Figure Skating Championships in 1981 and 1985, and captured the silver medal in four additional years.  The couple won the bronze at the European Figure Skating Championships in 1983 and 1984 and finished fifth at the 1984 Winter Olympic Games.  They also finished a career-best sixth place at the 1984 World Figure Skating Championships.

Results
(with Schubert)

References

Navigation 

1963 births
Living people
People from East Berlin
Figure skaters from Berlin
German female pair skaters
Figure skaters at the 1984 Winter Olympics
Olympic figure skaters of East Germany
European Figure Skating Championships medalists
20th-century German women